UFC on Fox: Johnson vs. Dodson (also known as UFC on Fox 6) was a mixed martial arts event held by the Ultimate Fighting Championship on January 26, 2013, at the United Center in Chicago, Illinois.

Background
A bout between Erik Koch and Ricardo Lamas, previously linked to UFC 155, was moved to this event to bolster the main card.

Buddy Roberts was expected to face Michael Kuiper at the event.  However, Roberts was forced out of the bout with an illness and was replaced by promotional newcomer Josh Janousek.  Then just days before the event, Janousek himself pulled out of the bout citing an injury.  With no time to find a suitable replacement for Kuiper, he was pulled from the event as well.

Magnus Cedenblad was expected to face Rafael Natal at the event but was forced out of the bout with an injury and replaced by promotional newcomer Sean Spencer.

Results

Bonus awards
Fighters were awarded $50,000 bonuses.

 Fight of the Night: Demetrious Johnson vs. John Dodson
 Knockout of the Night: Anthony Pettis
 Submission of the Night: Ryan Bader

See also
List of UFC events
2013 in UFC

References

External links
Official UFC past events page
UFC events results at Sherdog.com

Fox UFC
2013 in mixed martial arts
Mixed martial arts in Chicago
2013 in sports in Illinois
Events in Chicago